Ljubomir Simović (born 2 December 1935) is a Serbian poet, short story writer, playwright, and scriptwriter of TV dramas and movies. He is a member of the Serbian Academy of Sciences and Arts. His works have been translated in more than twenty languages.

Biography
Simović was born in the town of Užice, where he finished Gymnasium and Teacher's school. He graduated at Faculty of Philology(Department of History of Serbian and Yugoslav Literature) at University of Belgrade. He writes poems, novels, essays, literary criticism, but he is best known for his plays. He wrote 4 plays: Hasanaginica, A Miracle in Sargan (Serbian: Čudo u Šarganu), Traveling theatre Sopalovic (Serbian: Putujuće pozorište Šopalović) and The Battle of Kosovo (Serbian: Boj na Kosovu). His works have been translated into almost all European languages and his plays were performed in almost all theatres in Serbia. Also his plays were performed in France, Hungary, Czhez Republic, Germany, Switzerland, Slovenia, Russia, Bosnia and Herzegovina, Poland, Belgium, Croatia, North Macedonia, Canada, Mexico, and Morocco.

In 1996 he published "A chronicle, which is occasionally a novel, or a novel, which is occasionally a chronicle" about his hometown called "Uzice with the Crows" (Serbian: Užice sa vranama).

His selected works have been published in 12 books in 2008.

Works

 Slovenske elegije, (1958)
 Veseli grobovi, (1961)
 Poslednja zemlja, (1964) 
 Šlemovi, (1967)
 Uoči trećih petlova, (1972)
 Hasanaga's Wife, (1974)
 Miracle in Šargan, (1975)
 Subota, (1976)
 Vidik na dve vode, (1980)
 Um za morem, (1982)
 Deset obraćanja Bogorodici Trojeručici hilandarskoj, (1983)
 Duplo dno, (1983)
 Istočnice, (1983)
 Snevnik I-II, (1987)
 Gornji grad, (1990)
 Kovanica na Čakovina, (1990)
 Duplo dno, eseji o pesnicima, (1991)
 Igla i konac, (1992) 
 Galop na puževima, (1994)
 Uzice with the Crows, (1996)
 Ljuska od jajeta, (1998)
 Snevnik, dnevnik snova, 1998
 Novi galop na puževima, (1999)
 Duplo dno, eseji o srpskim pesnicima, o komedijama Sterije i Nušića, i o Životu i priključenijima Dositejevim, (2001)
 Čitanje slika, eseji o slikarima i vajarima, (2006)
 Kina: čitanje spaljenih knjiga, (2007)
 Planeta Dunav, (2009)
 Do Oba i Huangpua, (2016)
 Žabe u redu pred poktivačnicom, (2016)

Awards
Isidora Sekulić Award
Sterija Award for Hasanaginica (1975), A Miracle in Sargan (1993) and Traveling theatre Sopalovic (1986)
Honorable doctor of arts, University of Kragujevac
Dis Award
Dositej Obradović Award
Vasko Popa Award
Milan Rakić Award
Desanka Maksimović Award
Mića Popović Award
Đorđe Jovanović Award
Branko Miljković Award
Stefan Mitrov Ljubiša Award
Ljubomir Nenadović Award
Zmaj Award
Jovan Dučić Award
October Award
7 July Award
Despot Stefan Lazarević Award

References

External links

 

1935 births
Living people
Serbian male poets
Writers from Užice